The 1998–99 season was CS Sedan Ardennes' 80th season in existence and the club's first season back in the second division of French football. In addition to the domestic league, Sedan participated in this season's editions of the Coupe de France and the Coupe de la Ligue. The season covers the period from 1 July 1998 to 30 June 1999.

Pre-season and friendlies

Competitions

Overview

French Division 2

League table

Results summary

Results by round

Matches

Source:

Coupe de France

Coupe de la Ligue

References

External links

CS Sedan Ardennes seasons
CS Sedan Ardennes